John William Green may refer to:

 John Green (botanist) (born 1930), Australian botanist
 John W. Green (1781–1834), American lawyer and judge